Faryad Shiri (in Kurdish: فەریاد شیری) is a contemporary Iranian Kurdish poet, critic, writer and translator. He works on Kurdish and Persian literature. Faryad was born in Sahneh in 1971. He has published more than twenty works consisting of his poems, translations and stories. He also has received several awards such as the Iran poetry prize (2002).

Translations
Passport of smile and wish (translation of modern Kurdish poetry), Mina, 2002.
Love songs of chestnuts lands (translation of modern love songs of Kurdish poetry), Meshki, 2009
A lady whispered Love, Markaz, 2008
100 Sia Cahamana (Horami poetry), Meshki, 2007

Writings
Crows don’t understand sparrows (poetry collection) Dastan Publishing house, 1998.
My hug is full of journey (poetry collection), Nimnegah, 2003.
Black people, white people,Negima, 2003.
Crazy reading of rain (poetry collection in Kurdish language), Shola, 2005.
Kalamatarh, Morvarid, 2010
This name needs a new signature, Morvarid, 2010.
We were lost in the picture on the rain" (story-photo collection), Negima, 2000.
Homeland is not for sale (poetry collection), Negah, 2012.
I am lonelier than moon (poetry collection of Kurdish language), Dastan publishing house, 2012.

References

1971 births
Kurdish-language writers
Kurdish people
Living people